Essex High School may refer to:

 Essex High School (Vermont)
 Essex High School (Virginia)